The Jinghe–Alashankou Expressway, commonly referred to as the Jing'a Expressway and designated G3018, is an expressway under construction between Jinghe County and Alashankou in Bortala Mongol Autonomous Prefecture, Xinjiang, China. It will serve as a connection between Alashankou, the site of the Alataw Pass, which serves as a major border crossing between China and Kazakhstan, and the G30 Lianyungang–Khorgas Expressway at Jinghe. The expressway will be  in length. It will connect to the future G3019 Bole–Alashankou Expressway at about the halfway point, near the Bole railway station on the Northern Xinjiang railway. It is expected to open at the end of 2018.

References

Chinese national-level expressways
Expressways in Xinjiang